Yulius Mauloko (born 22 July 1990) is an Indonesian former footballer who played as a winger.

Career

Mauloko started his career with Indonesian top flight side Bali United. Before the 2017 season, he signed for Boavista FC in East Timor. In 2017, Mauloko signed for Indonesian top flight club Gresik United, where he made 12 league appearances and scored 0 goals and suffered relegation to the Indonesian second tier. On 26 August 2017, he debuted for Gresik United during a 0–5 loss to Bhayangkara.

Before the 2018 season, Mauloko signed for Western Knights in the Australian third tier after receiving an offer from Indonesian top flight team PSM, becoming the first player from East Nusa Tenggara to play abroad.

References

External links
 

1990 births
Association football wingers
Bali United F.C. players
Expatriate footballers in East Timor
Expatriate soccer players in Australia
Gresik United players
Indonesian expatriate footballers
Indonesian expatriate sportspeople in Australia
Indonesian expatriate sportspeople in East Timor
Indonesian footballers
Liga 1 (Indonesia) players
Living people
People from East Nusa Tenggara
Western Knights SC players